Hippotion melichari is a moth of the  family Sphingidae. It is found in Madagascar.

References

Hippotion
Moths of Madagascar
Moths of Africa
Moths described in 2001